Elmergib University is a public university in Al Khums, Libya. It was previously known as Intifada University and Nasser University.

References

External links
 Al-Mergib University website

Universities in Libya
Al Khums